Szanticska is a former village in Borsod-Abaúj-Zemplén County, Hungary. With a population of 5 people in 2001 Szanticska is famous for being regarded the smallest settlement in Hungary, although officially it is not an independent municipality but part of the village Abaújlak since 1870. In fact, mentioning it as "smallest settlement in Hungary" has neither official nor statistical basis rather it is a kind of urban legend born in the 1980s.

History
Szanticska was first mentioned in 1317. Its name comes from the name of St. Stephen (Szent István in Hungarian). During the Ottoman occupation of Hungary, the area was an important wine district, later it became deserted, but in the 18th century it was a populated place again. In 1870 it was annexed to Abaújlak.

Between the World Wars the village prospered, but the population started to decrease in the 1930s, mostly because the village didn't have a school. In 1988 the village had only one resident. During the 1990s Szanticska experienced a revival; some new residents settled down in the village and now it is a holiday resort where people can have an insight into everyday life of Hungarian peasants in the 19th century. Szanticska also hosts Hungarian schoolchildren during the summer for weeklong camps.

There are 19 houses and 2 churches in the village, as well as one store sporadically open an hour or two based on the number of visitors.

Other data
 Postal code: 3815
 Calling code: (+36) 46

References

External links
 A Vendégváró.hu cikke (Hungarian only)
 A Kastélyutak.hu cikke
 Picture gallery (not accessible to those outside the country)
 An article on Szanticska (Hungarian only)

Populated places in Borsod-Abaúj-Zemplén County
Former municipalities of Hungary